Stuckmann is a German surname. Notable people with the surname include:

Chris Stuckmann (born 1988), American film-critic
Henri Stuckmann (1906–1970), French boxer
Michael Stuckmann (born 1979), German soccer-player
Thorsten Stuckmann (born 1981), German soccer-player

German-language surnames